Costa Marques is a municipality located in the Brazilian state of Rondônia. Its population was 18,798 (2020) and its area is 4,987 km².

The city is located in the Guaporé River's right bank and the main attraction is Forte Príncipe da Beira (named after the Prince of Beira), which was built in 1786 by the Portuguese Kingdom to protect that region from the Spanish Crown.

The municipality contains 91% of the  Serra dos Reis State Park.
It contains 14% of the  Serra dos Reis A State Park, created in 1996.
It also contains 52.5% of the  Rio Cautário State Extractive Reserve, created in 1995.

References 

Municipalities in Rondônia